Eleanor Jones Harvey is a senior curator at the Smithsonian American Art Museum.

Career
Eleanor Harvey was born in Washington, D.C., and earned a B.A. with distinction from the University of Virginia, as well as an M.A. and Ph.D. from Yale University, in Art History.  She served as curator of American art at the Dallas Museum of Art from 1992-2002. In January 2003, she became the curator for the Luce Foundation Center for American Art at the Smithsonian American Art Museum, and served as the museum's Chief Curator from 2003 until 2012. She is currently Senior Curator. Her research interests include 19th- and 20th-century American art, landscape painting, Alexander von Humboldt, Southwestern abstraction, and Texas art. Her most recent exhibitions at the Smithsonian American Art Museum were Alexander von Humboldt and the United States: Art, Nature, and Culture in 2020-2021, The Civil War and American Art in 2012-13, Variations on America: Masterworks from the American Art Forum Collections in 2007, and An Impressionist Sensibility: The Halff Collection in 2006.

Works 
Alexander von Humboldt and the United States: Art, Nature, and Culture. Princeton University Press, 2020, 

 
An Impressionist Sensibility: The Halff Collection. Smithsonian American Art Museum, 2006, 
 (includes essay by Harvey)
Eleanor Jones Harvey, Gerald L. Carr. The Voyage of the Icebergs: Frederic Church's Arctic Masterpiece. Dallas Museum of Art, 2002, 
The Painted Sketch: American Impressions from Nature, 1830-1880. Dallas Museum of Art, 1998. New York: Harry Abrams, 1998,

References

External links 
Humboldt exhibition videos
C-SPAN appearances

Writers from Washington, D.C.
American art writers
Smithsonian Institution people
Year of birth missing (living people)
Living people
American art curators
American women curators
20th-century American women writers
20th-century American non-fiction writers
21st-century American women writers
21st-century American non-fiction writers
American women non-fiction writers
University of Virginia alumni
Yale University alumni